Barbonymus mahakkamensis is a species of cyprinid fish endemic to the island of Borneo where it is only known from the Indonesian portion of the island.

References

mahakkamensis
Freshwater fish of Indonesia
Fish described in 1922